Master of Pedret is the name given by historians to a Romanesque fresco painter active in Catalonia in the early twelfth century. The name has been given one of his most representative works, the right side of the apse of the church of San Quirze Pedret, now moved to the Museu Nacional d’Art de Catalunya, Barcelona, Spain.

Some paintings 
 Southern apse from Pedret - National Art Museum of Catalonia, Barcelona
 Central apse of St. Quirze Pedret-Diocesan and Regional Museum of Solsona Solsona
 Apse of Santa María d'Àneu (fragment) - Pedret Circle - National Art Museum of Catalonia
 Paintings of Cape Santa Maria Aran, The Cloisters, New York.
 Apse of Santa Eulalia Estaon and Surp-Circle-distant Pedret National Art Museum of Catalonia
 Crucifixion in the church of Santa Eulalia-Estaon Diocesan Museum of La Seu d'Urgell [8]
 Apostles from Àger

Gallery

References 

Painters from Catalonia
Romanesque artists
Pedret
Medieval Catalan artists
12th-century Catalan people